The Battle of Burki (Barki) was a battle fought by Indian infantry and Pakistani armour in the Indo-Pakistani War of 1965. Barki is a village that lies south-east of Lahore near the border with Punjab, just 11 km from the Allama Iqbal International Airport in Lahore, India and is connected to Lahore by the a bridge over the(BRB) Bambawali-Ravi-Bedian Canal. During the fighting, the relative strengths of the two sides were fairly even and Indian infantry clashed with Pakistani forces that were entrenched in pillboxes, dug-outs and slit trenches that had been carved into the canal banks. The Pakistanis were supported by a large number of tanks, as well as fighter jets. The battle resulted in an Indian victory.

Background
Pakistan launched Operation Grand Slam on 17 August 1965 in an effort to relieve infiltrators who had been surrounded after the failure of Operation Gibraltar on 15 August and to attempt to cut off the Indian supply lines. With supply lines under severe stress due to Operation Grand Slam, India launched an offensive towards Lahore to open up a second front in the war and distract Pakistani attention from Kashmir. After opening the Lahore Front, Indian troops advanced towards Lahore along three axes – the Amritsar-Lahore, Khalra-Burki-Lahore and Khem Karan-Kasur roads – overwhelming the small Pakistani force.

Indian infantry, supported by the only Indian armoured division, quickly pushed back unprepared Pakistani defenders with the aim of encircling and possibly besieging Lahore. Due to the element of surprise, India was able to capture a large amount of Pakistani territory from the town of Khalra, an Indian border town which lies on a straight road to Lahore through Burki. In the meantime, the Pakistani Army mobilised the troops in the region and mounted a three-pronged counter-attack to recapture lost ground. The Battle of Burki was subsequently fought on Khalra-Burki-Lahore road.

Pakistan's main goal was to force the Indian infantry into retreat before their armoured support and supply lines could catch up. The Pakistani Army's aim also was to capture much of the territory it had lost earlier in the fighting. The Indian infantry's aim was to capture and hold the town of Burki until reinforcements, including armour and supplies, could arrive.

Battle

India began their advance from Khalra under Major-General Har Krishan Sibal and tank operations under Lieutenant-Colonel Anant Singh with a village called Jahman being the first major Pakistani outpost to fall. Pakistani troops pulled back towards the next major town, which was Burki, leaving small pockets of resistance at each village to slow down Indian advance.

On 8 September, Pakistan began the counter-attack with Pakistani artillery pounding the Indian advance on 8, 9 and 10 September. This constant shelling slowed down the Indian advance but was unable to stop it completely. This was followed by a counterattack by Pakistani armour consisting of considerable part of Pakistan's 1st Armoured Division. Indian infantry eventually clashed with Pakistani tanks at Burki, which resulted in most of the Pakistani armour being damaged or destroyed by 10 September.

The Indian infantry was able to hold off the Pakistani armoured units until Indian tanks from the 18th Cavalry Regiment arrived. They were then able to subsequently launch the main assault on 10 September with armour support. As most of the Pakistani tanks had already been incapacitated, the Pakistani defenders had little armoured support from the remaining tanks. A few Pakistani fighter jets were called in to provide air cover for Pakistani troops and to target Indian positions. However, the use of fighters to perform ground strafing against ground troops instead of bombers with bombs and missiles meant that little was achieved through air support. The limited number of jets and the easy availability of trenches and defensive structures for cover added to the ineffectiveness of Pakistani air operations. As a result, after intense fighting, Indian infantry captured Burki on 11 September and held it throughout the rest of the war.

Aftermath
After the capture of Burki, the Indian advance continued towards Dograi, a town in the immediate vicinity of Lahore. The town and surrounding areas were captured on 22 September, bringing the city of Lahore within range of Indian tank fire. Despite the Indian Army's capture of the Burki sector through the Bambawali-Ravi-Bedian Canal, the outnumbered military companies under Major Raja Aziz Bhatti had forced the Indian Army to engage in hand-to-hand combat during the night of the 7–8 September 1965, and the fighting continued through the next three days despite the Indian Army's numerical advantage. Subsequently, the Indian Army's armour columns had to halt their plans of capturing Lahore but focus of securing the Burki sector and destroying the bridge connecting the Bambawali-Ravi-Bedian Canal.

Awards
Battle Honour of ‘Barki’ & theatre honour of Punjab 1965 was conferred on 16 Punjab, 4 Sikh and 9 Madras of 65 Infantry Brigade.

The 5 GUARDS of the Indian Army, which played an important part in capturing Burki, was also conferred with the "Battle Honour Burki" and "Theatre Honour Punjab".

The Pakistani commander, Major Raja Aziz Bhatti was later posthumously awarded the Nishan-e-Haider, the highest military decoration given by Pakistan. Each year he is honoured in Pakistan on 6 September, which is also known as Defence Day.

References

Conflicts in 1965
1965 in Pakistan
Battles of Indo-Pakistani wars
1965 in India
September 1965 events in Asia
Indo-Pakistani War of 1965